Avisa Nordland is a local newspaper published in Bodø, Norway.

History and profile
Avisa Nordland was established in February 2002 through a controversial merger of the two competing newspapers Nordlandsposten and Nordlands Framtid. Avisa Nordland has its headquarters in central Bodø, and until 2013 occupied most of the bank Nordlandsbankens former premises. In addition it has offices in Nordland small towns Fauske, Oppeid and Ørnes. 

In 2013, the newspaper moved its headquarters to a new office building in Bodø called Central Atrium.

Avisa Nordland is part of Amedia. In 2011, the paper won the World Young Reader Prize of WAN/IFRA in the editorial category for political papers.

In 2006 Avisa Nordland had a circulation of about 24,700 copies. It was 19,894 copies in 2013.

References

External links

2002 establishments in Norway
Newspapers established in 2002
Daily newspapers published in Norway
Norwegian-language newspapers
Mass media in Nordland
Amedia
Bodø